The FA Cup 1946–47 is the 66th season of the world's oldest football knockout competition; The Football Association Challenge Cup, or FA Cup for short. The large number of clubs entering the tournament from lower down the English football league system meant that the competition started with a number of preliminary and qualifying rounds. The 25 victorious teams from the Fourth Round Qualifying progressed to the First Round Proper.

Extra preliminary round

Ties

Replays

Preliminary round

Ties

Replays

2nd replays

1st qualifying round

Ties

Replays

2nd qualifying round

Ties

Replays

2nd replay

3rd qualifying round

Ties

Replays

4th qualifying round
The teams that entered in this round are: Leytonstone, Shrewsbury Town, Chelmsford City, Cheltenham Town, Colchester United, Lancaster City, Walthamstow Avenue, Guildford City, Gillingham, Dulwich Hamlet, Marine, Bath City, Workington, North Shields, South Bank, South Liverpool, Scarborough, Bromley, Wellington Town, Kidderminster Harriers, Witton Albion, Runcorn, Yeovil Town and Gainsborough Trinity

Ties

Replays

2nd replay

1946–47 FA Cup
See 1946–47 FA Cup for details of the rounds from the First Round Proper onwards.

External links
 Football Club History Database: FA Cup 1946–47
 FA Cup Past Results

Qualifying
FA Cup qualifying rounds